Lake Dapao is a deep water lake located in the province of Lanao del Sur, southwest of Lake Lanao, in the island of Mindanao in the Philippines. The lake receives water from local run-off and several small rivers.

Plants growing in the lake includes hydrilla (Hydrilla spp) and the filamentous alga (Clodophora spp). The lake is also rich in fish that includes dalág (Ophicephalus striatus), Mozambique tilapia (Oreochromis mossambicus), common carp (Cyprinus carpio), goby (Glossogobius giurus) and catfish (Clarias spp).

See also
 List of national parks of the Philippines

References

Dapao
Protected areas established in 1965
National parks of the Philippines
Landforms of Lanao del Sur
Tourist attractions in Lanao del Sur